Anthony James Pollard (born 1941) is a British medieval historian, specialising in north-eastern England during the Wars of the Roses. He is considered a leading authority on the field. He is emeritus professor of the University of Teesside. In addition to works on the Wars of the Roses, he has also written a general history of fifteenth-century England (2000) and books on Robin Hood (2004) and Warwick the Kingmaker (2007), Henry V (2014) and Edward IV (2016). He has in addition edited collections of essays on fifteenth-century history and the history of the north-east of England as a region.

Selected works 
 John Talbot and the War in France, 1427-1453. London: Royal Historical Society (1983). .
 The Wars of the Roses. Basingstoke: Macmillan Education (1988). .
 North-Eastern England during the Wars of the Roses. Oxford. Clarendon Press (1990)
 Richard III and the Princes in the Tower. Stroud: Sutton (1991). .
 (ed., with R. H. Britnell) McFarlane Legacy: Studies in Late Medieval Politics and Society. Stroud: Sutton (1995) 
 Late Medieval England. Harlow: Longman (2000). 
 Imagining Robin Hood: The Late-Medieval Stories in Historical Context. London: Routledge (2004). .
 Warwick the Kingmaker. London: Hambledon (2007). .
 Henry V. Stroud, History Press, 2014. 
 Edward IV. Penguin, 2016.

References 

1941 births
Living people
British medievalists
Academics of Teesside University